The Nika Award for Best Contribution to the Cinematic Science, Criticism and Education is given annually by the Russian Academy of Cinema Arts and Science and presented at the Nika Awards. The following are the recipients of the Cinematic Science, Criticism and Education Award since its inception in 2002.

Recipients

2000s

2010s

2020s

References

External links
  

Nika Awards
Lists of films by award